Offside is a 2005 German drama film directed by Buket Alakuş.

Plot
Hayat, a 20-year-old girl of Turkish-German descent is diagnosed with breast cancer and loses a breast. Against the will of her father Baba Can she rejoins her football team. The team's trainer Toni falls in love with Hayat.

Cast 
 Karoline Herfurth - Hayat
 Thierry Van Werveke - Baba Can
 Ken Duken - Toni

References

External links 

2000s sports drama films
German association football films
Grimme-Preis for fiction winners
2005 drama films
2005 films
2000s German films